ECU may refer to:

Currencies
 European Currency Unit, precursor to the euro
 Écu, French coins of the 13th–19th centuries

Technology
 Electronic control unit 
 Engine control unit

Universities
 East Carolina University, in Greenville, North Carolina, United States
 East Central University, in Ada, Oklahoma, United States
 Edith Cowan University, in Perth, Australia

Other uses
 Eastman Credit Union, an American credit union
 ÉCU The European Independent Film Festival
 Ecuador's country code
 Eighth Creative Union of MEPhI, a Russian theatre company
 End Citizens United, a PAC working to get big money out of politics
 European Chess Union
 Evidence Control Unit
 Extensor carpi ulnaris muscle
 Extreme close-up